David Pruiksma (born January 15, 1957) is an American animator, best known for his work for The Walt Disney Company, and occasionally other studios.

Early life and education
Pruiksma was born and raised in Falls Church, Virginia where he  attended J.E.B. Stuart High School. He graduated in 1975. He then studied art at the Pratt Institute in New York for two years. He left to attend California Institute of the Arts where he received a degree in character animation in 1981.

Career
Following graduation, Pruiksma was hired as an assistant animator at Disney and worked on the films The Black Cauldron, The Great Mouse Detective, Oliver & Company, The Little Mermaid, and The Rescuers Down Under. He rose to supervising animator and created the characters of Mrs. Potts and her son Chip for  Beauty and the Beast. Other characters included the Sultan for Aladdin, Pumbaa for The Lion King, Flit for Pocahontas and the characters Hugo and Victor for The Hunchback of Notre Dame.  

After completing working on 2001's Atlantis: The Lost Empire, Pruiksma left Disney because of his disenchantment with "Disney's greed-driven corporate structure." He then worked freelance as an animation director and storyboard artist for the Cartoon Network series Hi Hi Puffy AmiYumi. He also accepted a position teaching at the Laguna College of Art and Design (LCAD) from the animation department's former chair Dave Kuhn, who Pruiksma had trained at Disney.

Pruiksma was a full-time faculty member at LCAD in Laguna Beach, California until his retirement in 2018.

Filmography

References

External links
 Official website
 

Animators from Virginia
California Institute of the Arts alumni
Place of birth missing (living people)
Walt Disney Animation Studios people
Living people
1957 births